Edward Lofley (c.1839–1889) was a New Zealand soldier, spa proprietor, tourist guide, and journalist. He was born in Headingley, a suburb of Leeds, in 1839. He fought in the Waikato War and at some point married a Maori wife.

References

1839 births
1889 deaths
New Zealand journalists
People from Headingley
English emigrants to New Zealand
19th-century journalists
Male journalists
19th-century male writers